Shyqyri Ballgjini (born 14 March 1954) is a former Albanian footballer, who spent the most of his career, except one season, playing with Dinamo Tirana, as well as Albania. During his career, Ballgjini has scored more than 100 league goals and more than 50 Republic cup goals.

Club career
He was part of the 'Golden Age' of Dinamo, forming a successful offensive partnership Vasillaq Zëri and Ilir Përnaska which is considered to be the best offensive trio in Dinamo's history. During 1978–79, he played for Vllaznia Shkodër. He returned to Dinamo in 1979 where he stayed until 1984, the year he decided to end his football career.

Ballgjini was honored with the title "Legend of Albanian football", a title which is received by a total of 5–6 players. He is on the list of the 100 best Albanian players of all time.

International career
He made his debut for Albania in an April 1981 FIFA World Cup qualification match against West Germany and earned a total of 2 caps, scoring no goals. His second and final international was a September 1981 FIFA World Cup qualification match against Finland.

Personal life
His younger brother Haxhi Ballgjini also played for Albania and they were the first brothers to play for the national side together in 1981 against Finland.

Honours

Clubs
Dinamo Tirana
Albanian Superliga (5): 1972–73, 1974–75, 1975–76, 1976–77, 1979–80
Albanian Cup (2): 1973–74, 1977–78
Spartakiada Kombëtare (1): 1974
Kupa e Ushtrisë Popullore (2): 1973, 1978

Individual
Legend of Albanian Football.

References

External links

1954 births
Living people
Footballers from Durrës
Albanian footballers
Association football forwards
Albania international footballers
FK Dinamo Tirana players
KF Vllaznia Shkodër players
Kategoria Superiore players